Anna Babaji Latthe (9 December 1878 – 16 May 1950) or Annasaheb Latthe was an Indian politician, social reformer, educationist and leader of the Satyashodhak Samaj and Non-Brahmin movement.

Annasaheb Latthe started his career as a Lecturer of English in Rajaram College and later as Education Inspector of Kolhapur State. He was elected to the Central Legislative Assembly in 1920 from the Bombay Southern Rural constituency with the support of Shahu of Kolhapur.

Latthe was appointed as the advisor of Chhatrapati Rajaram III of Kolhapur State in 1925. After the retirement of Dewan Raghunathrao Sabnis, he was appointed as Dewan of Kolhapur. He was nominated by the Chamber of Princes Special Organisation to attend the Round Table Conference. He resigned as the Dewan in 1931 and settled in Belgaum.

Latthe joined the Indian National Congress in 1936 and in the 1937 Bombay Presidency election, he was elected to the Bombay Legislative Assembly from the Belgaum North constituency. He was appointed as the Finance Minister in the First Kher ministry. He was again elected to the Bombay Legislative Assembly in 1946.

References

Bombay Presidency
Kolhapur
Members of the Bombay State Legislative Assembly
Indian National Congress politicians from Karnataka